The Jim Sullivan Curling Classic is an annual curling tournament or bonspiel. It used to be held at the Thistle-St. Andrew's Curling Club in Saint John, New Brunswick, but is now held at the Capital Winter Club in Fredericton. The total purse for the men's event is CAD $15,300 with the winning team receiving $5,000. The purse for the women's event is $8,250 with the winner's share being $2,000.

The event is named in honour of Jim Sullivan, a curler in New Brunswick who committed suicide from depression in 2011. The event is a re-incarnation of previous bonspiels played at the Thistle-St. Andrew's Club such as the Fundy Line Cash Spiel, the Fundy Cash and the TSA Fundy Curling Classic (the latter being brought back by Sullivan in 2005).

The title sponsor for the event from 2015 to 2018 was World Financial Group.

In addition to curling, the tournament also attempts to raise awareness of the stigma and stereotypes associated with mental health issues.

The 2022 edition was played at the Capital Winter Club in Fredericton for the first time. It was held in place of the Steele Cup Cash which became the same event.

Past champions

Men

Women

References

External links
Official site

Curling in New Brunswick
Women's curling competitions in Canada
Sport in Fredericton
Curling competitions in Saint John, New Brunswick